Extensions is an album by jazz bassist Dave Holland released on the ECM label in 1990. The record is Dave Holland's eighth album to be released on the ECM label. It features two members of his previous quintet— saxophonist Steve Coleman and drummer Marvin "Smitty" Smith—alongside guitarist Kevin Eubanks, in his first appearance on a Holland record. Holland recorded "Processional" again on his later sextet album Pass It On.

Reception
The AllMusic review by Brian Olewnick called the album a "tight and enjoyable quartet date" and "One of his better albums from this period, Extensions should please any Holland fan, and is an agreeable and non-threatening jumping in point for the curious". 

Extensions was voted Album of the Year (1989) by Downbeat Magazine.

Track listing
 "Nemesis" (Kevin Eubanks) - 11:31
 "Processional" (Dave Holland) - 7:16
 "Black Hole" (Steve Coleman) - 10:10
 "The Oracle" (Dave Holland) - 14:32
 "101° Fahrenheit (Slow Meltdown)" (Steve Coleman) - 4:50
 "Color of Mind" (Kevin Eubanks) - 10:11
Recorded September 1989, Power Station, New York

Personnel
Steve Coleman – alto saxophone
Kevin Eubanks – electric guitar
Dave Holland – double bass
Marvin "Smitty" Smith – drums

References

External links

Dave Holland albums
1990 albums
Albums produced by Manfred Eicher